Oneida Township may refer to:

Canada
 Oneida Township, Ontario

United States

Iowa
 Oneida Township, Delaware County, Iowa
 Oneida Township, Tama County, Iowa

Michigan
 Oneida Charter Township, Michigan

Nebraska
 Oneida Township, Kearney County, Nebraska

Pennsylvania
 Oneida Township, Huntingdon County, Pennsylvania

South Dakota
 Oneida Township, Sanborn County, South Dakota, in Sanborn County, South Dakota

Township name disambiguation pages